Armsia petasus is a species of small, air-breathing, land snail, a terrestrial pulmonate gastropod mollusk in the family Amastridae. They are critically endangered by habitat loss.
This species is endemic to the United States.

References

Molluscs of the United States
Armsia
Taxonomy articles created by Polbot